Stone County is a county located in the U.S. state of Mississippi. As of the 2020 census, the population was 18,333. Its county seat is Wiggins. Stone County was formed from the northern portion of Harrison County on June 5, 1916.  The county was named for John M. Stone, who served as Governor of Mississippi from 1876 to 1882 and again from 1890 to 1896.

Stone County is included in the Gulfport-Biloxi, MS Metropolitan Statistical Area. In 1918, the Stone County Courthouse was completed at a cost of $29,515.18, and is still in use today, after several renovations.

Geography

Major highways
  U.S. Highway 49
  Mississippi Highway 15
  Mississippi Highway 26
  Mississippi Highway 29

Adjacent counties
 Perry County (northeast)
 George County (east)
 Jackson County (southeast)
 Harrison County (south)
 Pearl River County (west)
 Forrest County (northwest)

National protected areas
 De Soto National Forest (part)
 Sweetbay Bogs Preserve

Demographics

2020 census

As of the 2020 United States Census, there were 18,333 people, 6,334 households, and 4,560 families residing in the county.

2010 census
As of the census of 2010, there were 17,786 people, 6,165 households, and 4,539 families residing in the county.  The population density was 39.9 people per square mile (15.33/km2).  There were 7,161 housing units at an average density of 16 per square mile (6/km2).  The racial makeup of the county was 78.6% White, 19.1% Black or African American, with 2.3% being of other racial categories.  1.3% of the population were Hispanic or Latino of any race.

31.5% of households had children under the age of 18 living with them, 54.5% were married couples living together, 14.4% had a female householder with no husband present, 4.7% had a male household with no wife present, and 26.4% were non-families. 22.5% of all households were made up of individuals, and 8.6% had someone living alone who was 65 years of age or older.  The average household size was 2.68 and the average family size was 3.13.

24.4% were under the age of 18, 29.4% were under the age of 20, 32.3% from 20 to 44, 26.1% from 45 to 64, and 11.9% were 65 years of age or older.  The median age was 35.9 years. 50.1% of the population was male, and 49.9% was female.

The median income for a household in the county was $42,862, and the median family income was $48,083. Males had a median income of $42,773 versus $31,000 for females. The per capita income for the county was $21,806.  About 14.1% of families and 18.2% of the population were below the poverty line, including 24.9% of those under age 18 and 11.5% of those age 65 or over.

Arts and culture
On April 25, during the 2012 regular session of the Mississippi Legislature, Concurrent Resolution 643 was adopted by the state Senate and state House of Representatives, stating that Stone County be named and declared the Mural County of Mississippi.  During the previous 8 years, a Telling Trees Project was developed in Stone County to document and celebrate Stone County's history and heritage.  As part of that project, 23 murals, in the form of paintings and mosaic tiles, were created in cooperation with the Art Department, Perkinston campus of Mississippi Gulf Coast Community College and are on public display throughout the county.  The murals tell visual stories of Stone County's ecosystems, people, landmarks, and  industries.

Communities

Cities
 Wiggins (county seat)

Census-designated place
 Bond

Unincorporated communities

 Beatrice
 Big Level
 McHenry
 Perkinston
 Ramsey Springs
 Silver Run
 Ten Mile
 Texas

Education

Public school districts
 Stone County School District

Colleges
 Perkinston campus of Mississippi Gulf Coast Community College

Politics

See also
 National Register of Historic Places listings in Stone County, Mississippi
 Land Trust for the Mississippi Coastal Plain
 Sweetbay Bogs Preserve
 List of Mississippi Landmarks in Stone County

References

 
Mississippi counties
Gulfport–Biloxi metropolitan area
1916 establishments in Mississippi
Populated places established in 1916